The Flavono-ellagitannins or complex tannins are a class of tannins formed from the complexation of an ellagitannin with a flavonoid. Flavono-ellagitannins can be found in Quercus mongolica var. grosseserrata.

Examples 
 Acutissimin A
 Acutissimin B
 Camelliatannin G
 Epicutissimin A
 Mongolicains
 Mongolicain A
 Mongolicain B

References